In field theory, a primitive element of a finite field  is a generator of the multiplicative group of the field.

If  is a prime number, the elements of  can be identified with the integers modulo . In this case, a primitive element is also called a primitive root modulo .

The minimal polynomial of a primitive element is a primitive polynomial.

Properties

Number of primitive elements
This can be proved by using the theorem that the multiplicative group of a finite field  is cyclic of order , and the fact that a finite cyclic group of order  contains  generators.

See also
 Simple extension
 Primitive element theorem
 Zech's logarithm

References

External links

Finite fields